The Ardwell Group is a geologic group in Scotland. It preserves fossils dating back to the Ordovician period.

See also

 List of fossiliferous stratigraphic units in Scotland

References
 

Geologic formations of Scotland
Ordovician System of Europe
Ordovician Scotland
Paleontology in Scotland